Stamfordham is a village and civil parish in Northumberland, England. The population of the civil parish at the 2001 Census was 1,047, rising to 1,185 at the 2011 Census.  The place-name Stamfordham is first attested in the Pipe Rolls for 1188, where it appears as Stanfordhamn, which roughly translates as 'village at the stony ford'.

The Church of England parish church of St Mary the Virgin was built in the 13th century and overrestored under the direction of Benjamin Ferrey in 1848. In addition to St Mary's, there is a non-denominational Church on the Green. The large village green contains both a market cross (the Butter Cross, dating from 1735) and a village lock-up which is Grade II listed and dates from the early 19th century, pre-dating the formation of police forces.

The village has an Ofsted 'outstanding' rated school (Stamfordham Primary School), a historic Village Hall (originally the school), a public house (Swinburne Arms), an annual fête and car show held on the August bank holiday Monday (Stamfordham Village Fayre), and a number of local social and sports clubs, notably Stamfordham Cricket Club (playing at Grange Park on the southern edge of the village), the first team of which competes in the West Tyne League. The Grade II-listed Bay Horse Inn closed in November 2014.  The village is also host to a number of cycling events, including the Cyclone Festival of Cycling and the HSBC UK National Road Race Championships.

Governance 
Stamfordham was a parish until 1866, on 1 April 1955 the parish was reformed from Cheesebun Grange, Dalton, Eachwick, Harlow Hill, Hawkwell, Heugh, Nesbitt, and Ouston.

Notable people
 Sir Thomas Widdrington SL, English judge and politician, and founder of the school in Stamfordham in 1663.
 William Dixon, the compiler of the oldest collection of bagpipe music in the British Isles, lived in nearby  Ingoe, and many of the family are buried in Stamfordham.
 Arthur Bigge, 1st Baron Stamfordham, Royal Artillery officer and Private Secretary to Queen Victoria and King George V.
 Henry Twizel, former first class cricketer who played for Stamfordham Cricket Club.

References

Sources

External links

GENUKI 
Northumberland Communities

 
Villages in Northumberland
Civil parishes in Northumberland